Carolyn Wilkins may refer to:

 Carolyn A. Wilkins, Canadian economist
 Carolyn F. Wilkins (born 1945), Australian botanist